Gary Dean Bergen  (July 16, 1933 – July 27, 2010) was an American basketball player.  He played collegiately for the University of Utah.  Bergen was selected by the New York Knicks in the 1956 NBA Draft.  He played for the Knicks (1956–57) in the NBA for 6 games. Bergen died on July 27, 2010.

External links

1933 births
2010 deaths
Basketball players from Missouri
Kansas State Wildcats men's basketball players
New York Knicks draft picks
New York Knicks players
Sportspeople from Independence, Missouri
Utah Utes men's basketball players
American men's basketball players
Centers (basketball)